Daily Punjab Times is an Indian Punjabi language daily newspaper owned by PT Live Private Limited from Jalandhar, and published in Punjab, India. Baljit Singh Brar is the editor.

See also
The Tribune
Punjabi Tribune
List of Punjabi-language newspapers
List of newspapers
List of newspapers in India by circulation
List of newspapers in the world by circulation

References

External links
 - Official website
 - epaper

Punjabi-language newspapers published in India